Rendez-vous avec Maurice Chevalier n°2 is a French short film directed by Maurice Régamey in 1957.

Synopsis 
Maurice Chevalier visits several artists to discuss their work.

Songs

Anecdote 
Before Maurice Chevalier sings Mon p'tit Moustique,  he hums three songs composed by Henri Betti : La Chanson du Maçon (lyrics by Maurice Vandair), Le Régiment des Mandolines (lyrics by Maurice Vandair) and C'est si bon (lyrics by André Hornez).

References

External links 

1957 films
1957 short films
French black-and-white films
French short films
Maurice Chevalier